Carda is one of 41 parishes (administrative divisions) in Villaviciosa, a municipality within the province and autonomous community of Asturias, in northern Spain. 

Villages and hamlets
 Abeu
 Ayones
 Las Callejas
 Carda
 La Espuncia
 La Payariega
 El Pinu
 El Porreu
 Miyares
 Montotu
 Solapeña

References

Parishes in Villaviciosa